

Biography 

From their native Panama, they began their careers in 1989, forming their first group named Impakto (Impact) under the direction of their father Dicky Gaitán, and the management of their mother Dalys. Along with their musical careers, they earned their college degrees as Business Administrator and Attorney, respectively. In 1997 they performed at the OTI Festival, representing their home country Panama. They also released their first album, Entregate (1997, lit. surrender), with songs of Omar Alfano, Pedro Azael, Ricardo Vizuette, Mary Lauret and many other songwriters. 

In 1999, they decided to settle in Miami, Florida, under the tutelage of Emilio Estefan, where they began their careers as producers, composers and arrangers, reaffirming their careers as musicians and singers. Since then, they had become highly successful. Tracks such as "Muy Dentro de Mi," "Ay Bueno," "Llore Llore," "Dame Otro Tequila," "No Llores," "No vale la pena" are critically acclaimed in the music industry.

In their second album Alberto and Ricardo, the skills and the development of rhythms and compositions continue to grow, and songs like "Mi amor no es un favor" and "Taca Taca" became hits in several countries. In Chile, "Taca Taca" became Song of the Year in 2003, and Gaitanes fill in conjunction with Mekano (TV show from Chile), at Monumental Stadium. From the same album, the song "Mi amor no es un favor" reached the top on U.S., Latin America and Spanish radios. In their third album Monte Adentro (Deep Country), they dedicated the lyrics and music to their homeland, Panama. The whole album conveys emotions and nostalgia of an alien outside their homeland. From this album, the outstanding song "Monte Adentro" was filmed in the province of Herrera, Panama. In 2008, as a producer and songwriter, they won two Latin Grammy awards for 90 Millas (90 Miles) (Gloria Estefan album), and for the Best Contemporary Salsa Album and Best Tropical Song of the Year.

In 2008 Issac Delgado's single "No vale la pena" (nominated for Latin Grammy Awards 2009), composed by the duo, reached the top of the world's tropical stations. Between mid-2008 and early 2010, they produced two groups of Spanish rock from Guatemala. The first, Viento en Contra, found them pre-nominated for Latin Grammy awards 2010. The second is Tambor de la Tribu. Between 2008 and 2010 they released five singles, "Hazme Sentir (Make Me Feel)." arranged by Cucco Peña; "No juegues conmigo" (Don't play with me), a duet with Ivan Barrios (Panamanian pop singer); "Tengo tantas cosas" (I have so many things), a duet with Samy y Sandra Sandoval (Panamanian cumbia group); "La Señal" (The Sign), with Commando Tiburon (reggaeton group from Panama); and "El Preso (The Prisoner)," with Los Rabanes (Panamanian rock group). The latter was a fusion of Caribbean rhythms, combined with rap and compa (Haitian) rhythms, which was popular in the 1970s by Fruko y Sus Tesos. 

Their album Caminos was nominated to 2012 Latin Grammy in Best Tropical Contemporary Album Category, and they launched their latest CD La Parranda where they paid tribute to the Panamanian music.

In 2014 they made their album The Kings, including duets with Willie Colón, Oscar D'León, Rey Ruiz, Sergio Vargas and Tito Nieves. In December 2016 they launched their album La Parranda de Gaitanes, in which they pay tribute to the great Panamanian musician Lucho Azcarraga. This album was nominated for Latin Grammy 2017, in the category Best Contemporary Tropical Album.

In 2016 they released their album "La Parranda de Gaitanes" in tribute to the great Panamanian musician Lucho Azcarraga. Album nominated for Latin Grammy 2017 in the category Best Contemporary Tropical Album.

In 2018 they composed, arranged and produced a song in honor of the Panama soccer team, which for the first time was going to a World Cup of that sport. The song is titled "Rise the tide." Several fellow singers from Panama sang the song. Later, at the end of the year, they composed, produced and arranged another song, called "La Bendición," which is chosen as the song of the Telethon 20-30 of Panama.

In 2019, Ricardo was named Consul General of Panamá in the city of Miami, Fl. USA.

In 2020, they released two singles, "Desesperado" and "Rumba y Fiesta".

They are working on their eight album, which is expected to be available on multiple streaming platforms mid-2022. However, they are yet to release it.

Discography 

 Entrégate, 1997
 Alberto y Ricardo, 2001
 Monte Adentro, 2006
 Grandes Exitos, 2008
 Caminos, 2011
 La Parranda, 2012
 The Kings, 2014
 La Parranda de Gaitanes, 2016

Singles 

 Entrégate, 1997
 No sé que hacer, 1997
 Dimelo Amigo, 1997 (with Tony Vega)
 Mi amor no es un favor, 2001
 De qué nos vale, 2002
 Volveré alguna vez, 2002
 Taca Taca, 2002
 Galán de Novela, 2002
 Te Conozco, 2002 (Arjona Tropical Album)
 Monte Adentro, 2006
 Solo te pido, 2006
 Asi es mi vida, 2006
 Te vas, 2006
 Hazme Sentir, 2008
 No juegues conmigo, 2008 (with Iván Barrios)
 Quien, 2009
 Tengo tantas cosas, 2009 (with Samy y Sandra Sandoval)
 La Señal, 2009 (with Comando Tiburón)
 El Preso, 2010 (with Emilio Regueira)
 Tu ni te imaginas, 2011
 Regresa Pronto, 2012 (with Victor Manuelle)
 Inventaré, 2012
 Soy, 2012
 Tu me respondes, 2012
 Adonay, 2012 (with Willy Chirino)
 Para Mi, 2013
 Solo Contigo, 2013
 Que te parece Cholito, 2013
 Guararé, 2013
 Mi Gallo Pinto, 2013
 De qué me vale, 2014 (with Willie Colón)
 La media vuelta, 2015 (with Rey Ruiz)
 Me cayó del cielo, 2015 (with Oscar D'León)
 Quiero dormir cansado., 2015 (with Tito Nieves)
 La Mesa., 2015
 Esta Navidad., 2016
 Amor Amor. (Perú), 2017 (with Jocimar y su Yambú)
 Solo te pido., 2017
 Me sube hasta el cielo., 2017 (with J Ruiz & Orquesta Café)
 Sube la marea., 2018 (Various Artists)
 La Bendición., 2018 (Teletón 20-30) (Various Artists)
 Desesperado., 2020
 Rumba y Fiesta., 2020

Collaborations as Singers

 Arjona Tropical, Te Conozco, 2001
 Chasing Papi, Taca Taca, 2004
 Edwin Bonilla (Homenaje a los Rumberos), Canto Abacua, 2010 (Latin Grammy 2011 Nominated)
 Mirella Cesa (Duet), Por que te vas, 2012
 Nauta (Duet), 'Contigo soy feliz", 2014
 Jocimar y su Yambú (Duet), 'Amor Amor", 2017
 Rubén Blades, Omar Alfanno, Erika Ender, Emilio Regueira, Nando Boom, and many more (Various Artists), "Sube la marea", 2018
 La Bendición., 2018 (Teletón 20-30)(Various Artists)

Productions and Collaborations as Producers and Composers 

 Mi forma de sentir, Gianko, 1998 (Composers)
 Arrasando, Thalía, 2000 (Background Vocals)
 Alma Caribeña, Gloria Estefan, 2000 (Musicians, Background Vocals, Arrangers)
 Por un beso (Salsa Version), Gloria Estefan, 2000 (Producers, Arrangers, Musicians, Background Vocals)
 Better part of me, Jon Secada, 2000 (Producers, Arrangers, Musicians, Background Vocals)
 Muy dentro de mi (You sang to me), Marc Anthony, 2000 (Composers)
 Rabanes, Los Rabanes, 2000 (Background Vocals)
 Sound Loaded, Ricky Martin, 2000 (Composers)
 Encore, Roberto Blades, 2000 (Background Vocals)
 Shalim, Shalim, 2000 (Producers, Arrangers, Musicians, Background Vocals)
 Mi Corazon, Jaci Velasquez, 2001 (Producers, Arrangers, Composers, Musicians, Background Vocals)
 Mal Acostumbrado, Fernando Villalona, 2002 (Producers, Arrangers, Composers, Musicians, Background Vocals)
 Miami Sound Machine, MSM, 2002 (Producers, Arrangers, Composers, Musicians, Background Vocals)
 Amanecer, Jon Secada, 2002 (Producers, Arrangers, Composers, Musicians, Background Vocals)
 Dame de eso, Carlos Baute, 2002 (Producers, Arrangers, Musicians, Background Vocals)
 A Tiempo, Gian Marco, 2002 (Background Vocals)
 Jimena, Jimena, 2003 (Producers, Arrangers, Composers, Musicians, Background Vocals)
 Latin Songbird, La India, 2003 (Producers, Arrangers, Composers, Musicians, Background Vocals)
 Cuarto sin Puerta, Shalim, 2003 (Producers, Arrangers, Musicians, Background Vocals)
 Almas del Silencio, Ricky Martin, 2003 (Producers, Arrangers, Composers, Musicians, Background Vocals)
 Las Miami, MSM, 2004 (Producers, Arrangers, Composers, Musicians, Background Vocals)
 Unwrapped, Gloria Estefan, 2004 (Composers)
 Tu Fotografia (salsa version), Gloria Estefan (Producers, Arrangers, Musicians, Background Vocals).
 The Last Don Live, Don Omar, (Carta a un amigo - Salsa Version), 2004 (Producers, Arrangers, Musicians, Background Vocals)
 Asi soy yo, David Bustamante, 2004 (Producers, Arrangers, Composers, Musicians, Background Vocals)
 Seducción, Jennifer Peña, 2004 (Producers, Arrangers, Composers, Musicians, Background Vocals)
 Chasing Papi, Soundtrack, 2004 (Singers, Producers, Arrangers, Composers, Musicians, Background Vocals)
 Empire, Soundtrack, 2004 (Composers)
 Paulatina, Paulina Rubio, 2004 (Producers, Arrangers, Composers, Musicians, Background Vocals)
 Travesia, Victor Manuelle, 2004 (Producers, Arrangers, Composers, Musicians, Background Vocals)
 Lamento (Salsa Version), Gian Marco, 2004 (Producers, Arrangers, Musicians, Background Vocals)
 No hace falta (Salsa Version), Cristian Castro, 2005 (Producers, Arrangers, Musicians, Background Vocals)
 Greatest Hits, Thalia, 2005 (Producers, Arrangers, Composers, Musicians, Background Vocals)
 El Rock de mi Pueblo, Carlos Vives, 2005 (Background Vocals)
 Abreme la puerta, Erika Ender, 2005 (Producers, Arrangers, Musicians, Background Vocals)
 Sedúceme, La India, 2005 (Producers, Arrangers, Composers, Musicians, Background Vocals)
 Noelle, Gloria Estefan, 2005 (Producers, Arrangers, Composers, Musicians, Background Vocals)
 Otra Vez, Ilsa, 2005 (Producers, Arrangers, Composers, Musicians, Background Vocals)
 Gio, Gio, 2006 (Producers, Arrangers, Composers, Musicians, Background Vocals)
 Selena Vive, Gloria Estefan, 2006 (Producers, Arrangers, Musicians, Background Vocals)
 Christian Danielle, Christian Danielle, 2006 (Producers, Arrangers, Composers, Musicians, Background Vocals)
 Obsesión, Daniela Castillo, 2006 (Producers, Arrangers, Composers, Musicians, Background Vocals)
 90 Millas, Gloria Estefan, 2007 (Producers, Arrangers, Composers, Musicians, Background Vocals)
 Asi Soy, Issac Delgado, 2008 (Composers)
 Casino, Viento en Contra, 2009 (Producers, Arrangers, Composers, Musicians, Background Vocals)
 Los Guerreros de Barrio, La K-Shamba, 2009 "Perdona" (Composers)
 Perfume, El Tambor de la Tribu, 2010 (Producers, Arrangers, Composers, Musicians, Background Vocals)
 Natalia Jimemez, Natalia Jimenez, 2011 (Producers, Arrangers, Musicians)
 El Noble de la Salsa, Johnny Rivera, 2011 "Golpe bajo al corazón" (Composers)
 Super Cubano, Issac Delgado, 2011 "Perdona, Mienteme" (Composers)
 Mas Allá, Gusi y Beto, 2012 "Te Juro" (Composers)
 Viajero Frecuente, Ricardo Montaner, 2012 "Hazme Regresar" (Composers)
 Deseo Concedido, Mirella Cesa, 2012 (Producers, Arrangers, Composers, Musicians, Background Vocals)
 One Flag, Elvis Crespo, 2013 (Background Vocals)
 Radio Universo, Chino & Nacho, 2013 (Background Vocals & Keyboards)
 Sube la marea, Various Artists, 2018 (Producers, Singers, Arrangers, Composers, Musicians, Background Vocals)
 La Bendición, Various Artists, 2018 (Producers, Singers, Arrangers, Composers, Musicians, Background Vocals)

Awards & Nominee

 ASCAP, 2000, (Song: Muy dentro de Mi), Marc Anthony
 BMI, 2000, (Song: Muy dentro de mi), Marc Anthony
 Grammy, 2001, (Album: Alma Caribeña), Gloria Estefan (Nominee)
 Latin Grammy, 2001, (Album: Arrasando), Thalia (Nominee)
 Premios Lo Nuestro, 2002, (Album: Alberto y Ricardo), Ricardo y Alberto (Nominee)
 Latin Grammy, 2002, (Album: A Tiempo), Gian Marco (Nominee)
 Grammy, 2002, (Album: Mi Corazón), Jaci Velazquez (Nominee)
 Grammy, 2002, (Album: Mal Acostumbrado), Fernando Villalona (Nominee)
 BMI, 2002, (Song: Ay Bueno), Fernando Villalona
 Grammy, 2003, (Album: Latin Songbird), India (Nominee)
 Latin Grammy, 2003, (Album: Latin Songbird), India (Nominee)
 Grammy, 2004, (Album: Latin Songbird), India (Nominee)
 Latin Grammy, 2004, (Album: Por Ti), Banda El Recodo (Nominee)
 Latin Grammy, 2004, (Album: Almas del Silencio), Ricky Martin (Nominee)
 Latin Grammy, 2004, (Album: Travesia), Victor Manuelle (Nominee)
 Latin Grammy, 2004, (Album: Pau-latina), Paulina Rubio (Nominee)
 BMI, 2004, (Song: Dame otro tequila), Paulina Rubio
 BMI, 2005, (Song: Llore Llore), Victor Manuelle
 Grammy, 2005, (Album: Travesia), Victor Manuelle (Nominee)
 Grammy, 2005, (Album: Pau-latina), Paulina Rubio (Nominee)
 Latin Grammy, 2005, (Album: The Last Don Live), Don Omar (Nominee)
 Latin Grammy, 2006, (Album: Soy Diferente), India (Nominee)
 Billboard, 2008, (Album: 90 Millas), Gloria Estefan
 Latin Grammy, 2008, Best Traditional Tropical Album, (Album: 90 Millas), Gloria Estefan (Winner)
 Latin Grammy, 2008, Best Tropical Song, (Song: Pintame de Colores), Gloria Estefan (Winner)
 Latin Grammy, 2009, Best Tropical Song, (Song: No vale la pena), Issac Delgado (Nominee)
 Latin Grammy, 2011, (Album: Homenaje a los Rumberos), Edwin Bonilla (Nominee)
 Grammy, 2012, (Album: Homenaje a los Rumberos), Edwin Bonilla (Nominee)
 Latin Grammy, 2012, Best Tropical Contemporary Album, (Album: Caminos), Gaitanes (Nominee)
 Latin Grammy, 2017, Best Tropical Contemporary Album, (Album: La Parranda de Gaitanes), Gaitanes (Nominee)

Billboard 

 Muy dentro de Mi, Marc Anthony, 2000 (# 1)
 Ay Bueno, Fernandito Villalona, 2002 (# 1)
 Dame otro tequila, Paulina Rubio (# 1)
 Mia, Paulina Rubio, 2004 (# 5)
 Llore Llore, Victor Manuelle, 2004 (# 1)
 Tengo Ganas, Victor Manuelle, 2004 (As Producers) (# 1)
 No Llores, Gloria Estefan, 2007 (# 1)
 Me odio, Gloria Estefan, 2008
 No vale la pena, Issac Delgado, 2008 (# 2)
 De que me vale, Gaitanes feat. Willie Colón, 2015 (# 25)

Decorations 

Keys to the City (Llaves de la ciudad) - Panamá, Dec. 2008.

Music Composer Day - Panamá, Sept. 24, 2016

Gaitan Bros Productions S.A. (Panamá) 

Event producer Company founded by Ricardo & Alberto Gaitan with his family. Events have been held since 2007. Among the events held, stand Raul Diblassio & Richard Clayderman, Luis Enrique with Gaitanes and Omar Alfanno, SALSA The Festival and The Kings Tour with Willie Colón, Oscar D'León, Tito Nieves, Victor Manuelle, Issac Delgado, India and Rey Ruiz, under the musical direction of Cucco Peña, Alejandro Sanz Panamá Tour, Elton John and many more.

Stereo 5000 Sonido y Luces S.A. (Panamá) 

Sound and Light Company founded by his parents. The company has over 25 years of being # 1 in Panama. Most of the shows in Panama are made by the company.

Gaitan Bros Recording Studios 

Recording Studio located in Miami Florida, where they make all their productions.

References

External links 
  

Latin Grammy Award winners
Salsa musicians
Panamanian songwriters
20th-century Panamanian male singers
20th-century Panamanian singers
Latin music songwriters
21st-century Panamanian musicians
21st-century Panamanian male singers
21st-century Panamanian singers
Year of birth missing (living people)
Living people